Francesco is a given name.

Francesco may also refer to:

 Francesco (1989 film), a docu-drama about St. Francis of Assisi
 Francesco (2002 film), a drama film about St. Francis of Assisi
 Francesco (2020 film), a documentary about Pope Francis

See also 
 De Francesco
 Di Francesco
 San Francesco (disambiguation)